Abraham Hodgson (1765 - 11 April 1837) was a merchant, planter, and slave owner in Jamaica. He was elected to the House of Assembly of Jamaica in 1820.

References 

Members of the House of Assembly of Jamaica
1765 births
1837 deaths
Planters from the British West Indies
British slave owners
18th-century British businesspeople
19th-century British businesspeople
18th-century Jamaican people
19th-century Jamaican people